Fencing at the 2013 World Combat Games, was held at St. Petersburg Sports and Concert Complex Hall 2, in Saint Petersburg, Russia, from the 24 to 26 October 2013.

Medal table
Key:

Medal summary

Men

Women

References

External links

 
2013
2013 World Combat Games events
2013 in fencing
International fencing competitions hosted by Russia